Andrew Graham Murray, 1st Viscount Dunedin,  (21 November 1849 – 21 August 1942) was a Scottish politician and judge. He served as Secretary for Scotland between 1903 and 1905, as Lord Justice General and Lord President of the Court of Session between 1905 and 1913 and as a Lord of Appeal in Ordinary between 1913 and 1932.

Background and education
Murray was the son of Thomas Graham Murray WS LLD (1816-1891) and Caroline Jane Tod, daughter of John Tod. His father and grandfather were solicitors, and founding partners of the Edinburgh firm Tods Murray & Jamieson. He was educated at Harrow and Trinity College, Cambridge.

Political and legal career, 1891–1905

Murray was called to the Scottish Bar in 1874 and became a Queen's Counsel in 1891. The latter year he was also elected Member of Parliament for Bute, a seat he held until 1905, and appointed Solicitor General for Scotland in Lord Salisbury's Conservative administration. The Conservatives lost power in 1892 but when they returned to office in 1895 under Salisbury, Murray was once again made Solicitor-General for Scotland.

In 1896 he was promoted to Lord Advocate and sworn of the Privy Council. He remained as Lord Advocate when Arthur Balfour became Prime Minister in 1902, but the following year he succeeded Lord Balfour of Burleigh as Secretary for Scotland, with a seat in the cabinet.

In 1900 he was living at 7 Rothesay Terrace in Edinburgh's fashionable West End.

Judicial career, 1905–1932
Murray left the government and parliament in February 1905, on being appointed Lord Justice General and Lord President of the Court of Session. He was raised to the peerage as Baron Dunedin, of Stenton in the County of Perth, on 9 March 1905. He held these posts until 1913, when he was appointed a Lord of Appeal in Ordinary.

During his tenure as a Law Lord he gave long majority judgments in cases including Metropolitan Water Board v Dick Kerr & Co Ltd concerning frustration and Tredegar v. Harwood concerning a landlord's liability to insure premises, Ellerman Lines Ltd v Murray on employment law and excessive reliance on a preamble or draft international instrument, Sorrel v Smith concerning the tort of conspiracy to interfere with a trade or calling, Leyland Shipping Co Ltd v Norwich Union Fire Insurance Society Ltd on causation in tort, Dunlop Pneumatic Tyre Co Ltd v New Garage & Motor Co Ltd on penalty clauses and Plumb v Cobden Flour Mills Co Ltd on employer's liability. In 1923 he was chairman of the Political Honours Review Committee. He retired as a Law Lord in 1932.

Apart from his legal and political career, Lord Dunedin was Sheriff of Perthshire between 1890 and 1891 and Lord Lieutenant of Buteshire between 1901 and 1905. He was appointed a Knight Commander of the Royal Victorian Order in 1908 and a Knight Grand Cross of the Royal Victorian Order in 1922. In 1926 he was further honoured when he was made Viscount Dunedin, of Stenton in the County of Perth.

Family
Lord Dunedin was twice married. He married firstly Mary Clementina, daughter of Admiral Sir William Edmonstone, 4th Baronet, in 1874. They had one son and two daughters. After Mary's death in December 1922 he married secondly Jean Elmslie Henderson Findlay, secretary of the Scottish War Savings Committee in WW1, and daughter of George Findlay, in 1923. They had no children. His only son the Hon. Ronald Thomas Graham Murray (1875–1934) was a major in the Black Watch and fought in the First World War. However, he died married but childless in September 1934, aged 59, predeceasing his father by eight years. Lord Dunedin died in August 1942, aged 92. As he had no surviving male issue both his titles became extinct on his death.

References

Notes

Sources

 Torrance, David, The Scottish Secretaries (Birlinn 2006)

External links 
 

|-

|-

1849 births
1942 deaths
Alumni of Trinity College, Cambridge
Viscounts in the Peerage of the United Kingdom
Lord-Lieutenants of Buteshire
Murray, Andrew
Scottish lawyers
Lord Advocates
Scottish sheriffs
Solicitors General for Scotland
Murray, Andrew
Members of the Privy Council of the United Kingdom
Knights Grand Cross of the Royal Victorian Order
Murray, Andrew
Murray, Andrew
Murray, Andrew
Murray, Andrew
UK MPs who were granted peerages
Members of the Judicial Committee of the Privy Council
Law lords
Lords President of the Court of Session
Lords Justice-General
Dunedin
Politics of the county of Bute
Peers created by Edward VII
Viscounts created by George V
People educated at Harrow School